Wee Grimmet is a historic home located in Whitford, West Whiteland Township, Chester County, Pennsylvania. The original section was built about 1820, and expanded about 1929 by architect John Gilbert McIlvaine, a partner of Wilson Eyre, and expanded again in late 1953.  It currently has common areas plus four bedrooms, four bathrooms, and five fireplaces. It is located on the Martha and Maurice Ostheimer Estate, along with the larger estate home known as "Grimmet." Wee Grimmet consists of a two-story, stuccoed stone core section with a gable roof. The addition contains a family room, a master bedroom, and two bathrooms. The original house was built as a dwelling for tenant workers in the limestone quarry, salt mine, and kiln nearby.

It was listed on the National Register of Historic Places in 1984.

References

Houses on the National Register of Historic Places in Pennsylvania
Houses completed in 1820
Houses in Chester County, Pennsylvania
National Register of Historic Places in Chester County, Pennsylvania